Nicole Alana Lazar (born December 14, 1966 in Washington, DC) is a statistician who holds triple citizenship as an American, Canadian, and Israeli. She is a professor of statistics at the University of Georgia, where she is acting head of the statistics department. Her research interests include empirical likelihood, functional neuroimaging, model selection and the history and sociology of statistics.

Lazar graduated magnum cum laude from Tel Aviv University in 1988.
After earning a master's degree in statistics from Stanford University in 1993, she completed her Ph.D. in 1996 at the University of Chicago, under the supervision of Per Mykland. She joined the Carnegie Mellon University faculty in 1996, and moved to Georgia in 2004. In 2015 she became editor-in-chief of The American Statistician.

She is the author of a book, The Statistical Analysis of Functional MRI Data (Springer, 2008).
One of her columns, "The Arts: Digitized, Quantified, and Analyzed", was selected for the anthology The Best Writing on Mathematics 2014.

In 2014 she was elected as a Fellow of the American Statistical Association "for foundational statistical contributions to the area of empirical likelihood; for the development of new statistical methods for the analysis of functional magnetic resonance imaging (fMRI) data; and for developing, reforming, and enhancing statistical education." In 2021 she was named a Fellow of the Institute of Mathematical Statistics.

References

1966 births
Living people
American statisticians
Canadian statisticians
Israeli statisticians
Women statisticians
Tel Aviv University alumni
Stanford University alumni
University of Chicago alumni
Carnegie Mellon University faculty
University of Georgia faculty
Fellows of the American Statistical Association
Fellows of the Institute of Mathematical Statistics